Choeromorpha flavolineata is a species of beetle in the family Cerambycidae. It was described by Breuning in 1939. It is known from Sulawesi.

References

Choeromorpha
Beetles described in 1939